David Brown (born October 19, 1992) is a visually impaired American sprint runner. He competed over 100–400 m distances at the 2012 and 2016 Paralympics and 2013 and 2015 world championships and won the 100 m event in 2015 and 2016. He currently holds the world record in the 100 m and 200 m run for the T11 class – being the first totally blind athlete to run 100 m within 11 seconds – as well as the paralympic record in the 100 run.

Biography 
He was born in Kansas City, Missouri, to Francine Brown, and has an elder sister named Breana. At the age of 15 months, he was diagnosed with Kawasaki disease, which led to glaucoma and complete blindness by the age of 13. Consequently, Brown moved from Kansas City to St. Louis to attend the Missouri School for the Blind at 11.

Brown began competing in abled athletics in 2006 during the Colorado Rocky Mountain State Games, competing in high jump, long jump, and wrestling events. Following his vision loss, he switched his focus to the 100 metres and 200 metres events, winning an essay contest to attend the 2008 Summer Paralympics and making his senior international debut at the 2011 Parapan American Games.

In May 2012, Brown started training with his current coach, Brazilian Olympic champion Joaquim Cruz, at the United States Olympic Training Center site of Chula Vista, California. Brown competed in the 2012 Summer Paralympics, reaching the semifinals in both the 100 meters and 200 meters.

Besides athletics, he trained in wrestling and goalball and played the drums, piano and tenor saxophone in a jazz band.

Since 2014, he runs with Jerome Avery, who has competed as a guide at four consecutive Paralympics since 2004, except for the 2020 Summer Paralympics where Brown was guided by Moray Steward.

References 

1992 births
Living people
American male sprinters
Paralympic track and field athletes of the United States
Athletes (track and field) at the 2016 Summer Paralympics
Paralympic gold medalists for the United States
Medalists at the 2016 Summer Paralympics
Paralympic gold medalists in athletics (track and field)
Medalists at the 2015 Parapan American Games
Medalists at the 2019 Parapan American Games
Athletes (track and field) at the 2020 Summer Paralympics
Track and field athletes from Kansas City, Missouri
American blind people